Robert Cole Nelson (January 30, 1920 – November 3, 1986) was an American football center.

Nelson was born in Paris, Texas, in 1920 and attended Bryan High School in Bryan, Texas. He played college football at Baylor and was the first-team center on the 1939 All-Southwest Conference football team.

Nelson was drafted by the Detroit Lions in the fifth round (35th overall pick) of the 1941 NFL Draft. He played for the Lions during the 1941 and 1945 seasons.  He served three-and-a-half years in the Navy during World War II. He served as a petty officer on a landing craft.

He jumped to the All-America Football Conference in 1946, playing for the Los Angeles Dons from 1946 to 1949. He concluded his career with Baltimore Colts in 1950.  He appeared in 71 professional football games, 52 of them as a starter. He was selected as a first-team player on the 1946 All-Pro Team and on the 1946 All-AAFC football team.

After retiring from football, Nelson received a law degree from Baylor and worked as the Milam County Attorney and later as in-house counsel for the Federal Aviation Administration. He died in 1986 in Fort Worth, Texas.

References

1920 births
1986 deaths
American football centers
Detroit Lions players
Los Angeles Dons players
Baltimore Colts players
Players of American football from Texas
People from Paris, Texas
Baylor Bears football players
People from Bryan, Texas
Baltimore Colts (1947–1950) players